Mossurize District is a district of Manica Province in western Mozambique. The principal town is Espungabera. The district is located in the south of the province, and borders with Sussundenga District in the north, Chibabava District of Sofala Province in the east, Machaze District in the south, and with Zimbabwe in the west. It has a population of 195,182 as of 2007.

Geography
The two main rivers in the district are the Mossurize River and the Buzi River. A number of rivers are seasonal and only flow during the rainy season.

History
The area was taken over by the Portuguese around 1890.

Demographics
As of 2005, 46% of the population of the district was younger than 15 years. 7% did speak Portuguese. The most common mothertongue is Chitwe language. 86% were analphabetic, mostly women.

Administrative divisions
The district is divided into three postos, Chiurairue (three localities), Dacata (four localities), and Espungabera (three localities).

Economy
1% of the households in the district have access to electricity.

Agriculture
In the district, there are 14,000 farms which have on average  of land. The main agricultural products are corn, cassava, cowpea, peanut, sorghum, pearl millet, and sweet potato.

Transportation
Most of the roads are in a bad state.

References

Districts in Manica Province